Clark Mills is a hamlet (and census-designated place) in Oneida County, New York, United States. The population was 1,905 at the 2010 census.

The community is located at the northeastern corner of the Town of Kirkland, west of the City of Utica.

History 
The hamlet is named after the Clark brothers, who ran a textile mill on the Oriskany Creek here from 1846.

St. Mark's Church was listed on the National Register of Historic Places in 1996.

Geography
Clark Mills is located at  (43.091919, -75.372091).

Demographics

As of the census of 2000, there were 1,424 people, 628 households, and 381 families residing in the CDP. The population density was 1,534.0 per square mile (591.2/km2). There were 668 housing units at an average density of 719.6/sq mi (277.3/km2). The racial makeup of the CDP was 98.53% White, 0.91% African American, 0.07% Native American, and 0.49% from two or more races. Hispanic or Latino of any race were 0.35% of the population.

There were 628 households, out of which 28.0% had children under the age of 18 living with them, 39.8% were married couples living together, 15.3% had a female householder with no husband present, and 39.3% were non-families. 32.6% of all households were made up of individuals, and 12.9% had someone living alone who was 65 years of age or older. The average household size was 2.25 and the average family size was 2.85.

In the CDP, the population was spread out, with 22.5% under the age of 18, 8.3% from 18 to 24, 29.3% from 25 to 44, 23.9% from 45 to 64, and 15.9% who were 65 years of age or older. The median age was 39 years. For every 100 females, there were 87.1 males. For every 100 females age 18 and over, there were 81.4 males.

The median income for a household in the CDP was $36,026, and the median income for a family was $45,833. Males had a median income of $32,036 versus $25,523 for females. The per capita income for the CDP was $18,101. About 3.6% of families and 6.9% of the population were below the poverty line, including 7.4% of those under age 18 and 2.7% of those age 65 or over.

References

Census-designated places in New York (state)
Hamlets in New York (state)
Utica–Rome metropolitan area
Census-designated places in Oneida County, New York
Hamlets in Oneida County, New York